The Northern Forest Canoe Trail (NFCT) is a  marked canoeing trail in the northeastern United States and Canada, extending from Old Forge in the Adirondacks of New York to Fort Kent, Maine. Along the way, the trail also passes through the states and provinces of Vermont, Quebec, and New Hampshire. The trail was  opened on June 3, 2006.

Overview

The trail has been likened to a water version of the Appalachian Trail, and there are many similarities: both are long-distance trails that most people will use for day trips or short overnight trips. Many of those who paddle the entire trail will do so in sections.  Unlike the AT, the NFCT obtains access for campsites and portages through landowner permission rather than through land protection. Also, many sections of the trail require a high level of skill to complete.

The trail is divided into 13 sections: Adirondack Country (West) New York, Adirondack North Country (Central) New York, Adirondack Country (East) New York, Islands and Farms Region Vermont, Upper Missisquoi Valley Vermont/Quebec, Northeast Kingdom Quebec/Vermont, Great North Woods New Hampshire, Rangeley Lakes Region Maine, Flagstaff Region Maine, Greater Jackman Region Maine, Moosehead/Penobscot Region Maine, Allagash Region (South) Maine, and Allagash Region (North) Maine. Each of these sections has been mapped and documented in order to establish the trail.

Trail towns include Old Forge, Richford, Vermont, The Errol-Berlin Corridor, New Hampshire and Rangeley, Maine. In Maine it primarily traverses through the North Maine Woods region

The trail covers 58 lakes and ponds, 22 rivers and streams, and 63 "carries" (portages) totaling .  On some sections of the trail, portage trails, campsites, and access areas are marked with Northern Forest Canoe Trail medallions,  a yellow diamond with blue lettering.

The American Canoe Association has named the NFCT an ACA-Recommended Water Trail.

Bodies of Water

New York (147 mi.) 

 Fulton Chain of Lakes
 Brown's Tract Inlet
 Raquette Lake
 Forked Lake
 Raquette River
 Long Lake
 Upper, Middle, and Lower Saranac Lakes
 Oseetah Lake
 Franklin Falls Pond
 Union Falls Pond
 Saranac River

Vermont & Québec (174 mi.) 

 Lake Champlain
 Missisquoi River
 North Branch Missisquoi River
 Lake Memphremagog
 Clyde River
 Clyde Pond
 Salem Lake
 Charleston Pond
 Pensioner Pond
 Island Pond
 Spectacle Pond
 Nulhegan Pond
 Nulhegan River

New Hampshire (72 mi.) 

 Connecticut River
 Upper Ammonoosuc River
 Androscoggin River
 Pontook Reservoir
 Umbagog Lake

Maine (374 mi.) 

 Umbagog Lake
 Rapid River
 Upper and Lower Richardson Lakes
 Mooselookmeguntic Lake
 Rangeley Lake
 Haley Pond
 South Branch Dead River
 Flagstaff Lake
 Dead River
 Spencer Stream
 Spencer Lake
 Fish Pond
 Attean Pond
 Big Wood Pond
 Moose River
 Long Pond
 Little Brassua Lake
 Brassua Lake
 Moosehead Lake
 West Branch Penobscot River
 Chesuncook Lake
 Umbazooksus Stream
 Umbazooksus Lake
 Mud Pond
 Chamberlain Lake
 Eagle Lake
 Churchill Lake
 Allagash River
 Umsaskis Lake
 Long Lake
 Round Pond
 St. John River

Through-paddlers
, 95 people have "through-paddled" the trail — traveling the length of the trail in one expedition. In addition, six other "section-paddlers" have completed it in multiple trips.

Nicole Grohoski and Thomas Perkins of Ellsworth, Maine were the first to officially through-paddle the trail in 2006, traveling the length of the trail in about 45 days.  Donnie Mullen paddled the trail in 2000 before its official opening, taking about 55 days but doing so without the signs and maps that were available in 2015.  The fastest thru-paddle was completed in 2012 Elspeth Ronnander, Erik Peih and Emily Johnson. the trip took them 21 days, 3 hours and 45 minutes.

Northern Forest Canoe Trail literature
"Paddling the Northern Forest Canoe Trail" by Sam Brakeley - a narrative of a 2009 thru-paddle in journal form.

"The Northern Forest Canoe Trail Through-Paddler's Companion" by Katina Daanen, a guide book to paddling the  water trail from its western terminus in Old Forge, New York to the eastern terminus in Fort Kent, Maine.

"Paddling Through Time - The Story of the Northern Forest Canoe Trail", Northern Forest Canoe Trail, 2006. , 64 pages.

References

External links
 Northern Forest Canoe Trail
 American Canoe Association

 

 
Canoeing and kayaking venues in the United States
Water trails
Water transportation in Maine
Water transportation in New Hampshire
Water transportation in New York (state)
Water transportation in Vermont
North Maine Woods
Penobscot River
Protected areas of Aroostook County, Maine
Protected areas of Piscataquis County, Maine
Tourist attractions in Maine
Tourist attractions in New Hampshire
Tourist attractions in New York (state)
Tourist attractions in Vermont